The Diocese of Amos is a Latin Church ecclesiastical territory or diocese of the Catholic Church that covers part of the Province of Quebec. The diocese was erected by Pope Pius XI on December 3, 1938. Joseph-Aldée Desmarais was named its first bishop on June 20, 1939 by Pope Pius XII.

The diocese has been headed by Gilles Lemay, formerly an auxiliary bishop of the Archdiocese of Quebec, since his installation on April 15, 2011. He replaced the retiring bishop, Eugène Tremblay, who had reached the mandatory retirement age for bishops of 75. The Diocese of Amos is a suffragan diocese in the ecclesiastical province of the metropolitan Archdiocese of Gatineau.

The diocese has 35 priests, 47 Religious Sisters, and 91,600 Catholics (2012).

Bishops

Diocesan bishops
The following is a list of the Bishops of Amos and their terms of service:
Joseph-Aldée Desmarais (1939-1968)
Albert Sanschagrin (auxiliary bishop, 1957-1967)
Gaston Hains (coadjutor, 1967-1968) (1968-1978)
Gérard Drainville (1978-2004)
Eugène Tremblay (2004-2011)
Gilles Lemay (2011–present)

Other priests of this diocese who became bishops
Roger Ébacher, appointed Bishop of Hauterive, Québec in 1979
Marc Ouellet, appointed titular archbishop in 2001; later Cardinal Archbishop of Quebec

References

External links
 Roman Catholic Diocese of Amos 

Amos
Catholic Church in Quebec
Amos, Quebec
Christian organizations established in 1938